The list of ship launches in 1803 includes a chronological list of some ships launched in 1803.


References

1803
Ship launches